Chlorocoma stereota, the white-lined emerald, is a moth of the family Geometridae first described by Edward Meyrick in 1888. It is known from Australia, including Victoria.

Adults are green. Each wing has a white sub-marginal line and the abdomen has a white dorsal line.

References

Geometrinae